Cunningham was an electoral district of the Legislative Assembly in the Australian state of Queensland from 1888 to 2009.

Prior to its abolition, the district occupied an area of the Darling Downs, south and west of Toowoomba. Historically it was centred on the town of Clifton. The eastern portion of Cunningham drew voters from the southern suburbs of Toowoomba. There were also a number of small rural towns in the electorate, including Pittsworth, Millmerran and Cambooya, but no major centres.  It was solidly conservative for its entire existence, and was held by the National Party without interruption from 1920 until the Nationals merged into the Liberal National Party of Queensland.

In 2008, Cunningham was abolished—with effect at the 2009 state election—following a redistribution undertaken by the Electoral Commission of Queensland. Its former territory and voters were split between the districts of Toowoomba South, Southern Downs and the new seat of Condamine.

Members for Cunningham

Election results

See also
 Electoral districts of Queensland
 Members of the Queensland Legislative Assembly by year
 :Category:Members of the Queensland Legislative Assembly by name

References

External links
West Queensland, Cunningham
Results of the 2004 State Election
Stuart Copeland's Biography from the Queensland Parliament website.

Darling Downs
Toowoomba
Former electoral districts of Queensland
Constituencies established in 1888
Constituencies disestablished in 2009
1888 establishments in Australia
2009 disestablishments in Australia